Stringtown is an unincorporated community in Boone County, Kentucky, United States.

Notes

Unincorporated communities in Boone County, Kentucky
Unincorporated communities in Kentucky